Testing Anywhere is software produced by San Jose-based Automation Anywhere, Inc. (est. 2003). The software allows testers and developers to test applications, Web sites, objects, controls and GUI front-ends.
The company has been featured in SD Times
for its creation of "Object Avatars", and has over 25,000 customers.

Uses
Testing Anywhere is used to record, debug, schedule, and run test cases for a wide variety of application types, such as Java, Silverlight, .Net, mainframe, C++, etc.

Automating Test Case Creation 
Test cases are created using one of five methods (web recording, object recording, image recognition, Smart recording, editor). These test cases are recorded, saved, and can be edited and enhanced.

Test cases are edited with an editor. Wizards make it possible for people with no programming skills to create and edit these test cases.

Executable (EXE) files can be created so that testers can deploy (run) them on remote machines.

A workflow designer creates high-level business and IT processes and enables the ability to manage them.

Supported OS

Microsoft Windows 8 (32 bit and 64 bit editions), Microsoft Windows 7 (32 bit and 64 bit editions), Microsoft Windows Vista (32 bit and 64 bit editions), Microsoft Windows Server 2012, Microsoft Windows Server 2008 R2, Microsoft Windows Server 2003, Microsoft Windows XP (32 bit and 64 bit editions) with Service Pack 2.

References

External links

See also

 Test automation
 GUI software testing
 List of GUI testing tools

Software testing tools
Graphical user interface testing
Unit testing